Valentino Fois (September 23, 1973 in Bergamo – March 23, 2008 in Villa d'Alme) was an Italian cyclist. He participated in 2 editions of the Tour de France.

Major results
1995
1st Giro della Valle d'Aosta
1996
1st stage 5 Tour de Pologne
1997
3rd Italian National Road Race Championships
1999
1st Giro del Mendrisiotto

References

1973 births
2008 deaths
Italian male cyclists
Cyclists from Bergamo
20th-century Italian people